Likila is a community council located in the Butha-Buthe District of Lesotho. Its population in 2006 was 19,340.

Villages
The community of Likila includes the villages of:

'Maeneng
Basieng
Bochabane
Bohataneng
Boiketlo
Europe
Ha Bafokeng
Ha Bokoro
Ha Botilo
Ha Chaba
Ha Hlasoa (Tsime)
Ha Katamelo
Ha Khabele
Ha Lebesa (Sehleke)
Ha Lebetla
Ha Lebetla (Maforeng)
Ha Lefera
Ha Lekopa

Ha Letlala
Ha Maloi
Ha Manana (Ha Chaba)
Ha Mantseiseng
Ha Maphalala
Ha Marakabei
Ha Maseretse
Ha Mashoba
Ha Mashopha
Ha Mashopha (London)
Ha Molibetsane
Ha Mosikela
Ha Mpepe
Ha Mphahlela
Ha Mpharoane
Ha Nchee (Phahameng)
Ha Paramente
Ha Pataka

Ha Ramohapi
Ha Ranakeli (Tsime)
Ha Rasekila
Ha Seboche
Ha Sekhonyana (Tetete)
Ha Tabolane
Ha Tlali (Phahameng)
Ha Tumane
Hleoheng
Joala-Boholo
Khukhune
Koung
Letobong
Liphakoeng
Liseleng
Litaung
Mabaleng
Mahlabatheng

Makeneng
Mankising
Marabeng
Masere
Matsoapong
Matumeng
Mochaoane
Paballong
Phamistone
Sekhutlong
Sekokong
Senkhane
Sheeshe
Taung
Thaba-Boqele
Thaba-Kholo
Thabong

References

External links
 Google map of community villages

Populated places in Butha-Buthe District